Augusta Browne (1820–1882) was an American composer, publisher, and author. She started the first wave of female composers in the country. Wake, Lady Mine, written in 1845, is one of her best known works.

Biography
Augusta Browne Garrett was born in 1820 in Dublin, Ireland. Browne was known as "the most prolific woman composer in America before 1870." Browne composed over 200 works for piano and voice, along with numerous hymns and secular pieces. Browne often collaborated with lyricists, creating musical settings to accompany lyrics written by said lyricists.

In addition to her musical works, Browne published two books – one of which was about her brother entitled Hamilton, the Young Artist — and numerous essays, religious tracts, poetry, and short stories. 

One of Browne's most famous articles criticized the popular "minstrel music" of the mid-1800s, calling it "melodic trash." Though the opinion was controversial, her article was reprinted in several music journals.

Browne died on January 11, 1882, and was buried in Green-Wood Cemetery, New York.

Notes

References

Further reading

External links
 

American women composers
1820 births
1882 deaths
19th-century American composers
19th-century women composers
19th-century American women musicians